is a children's anime TV series created by Fujiko F. Fujio and based on the manga series of the same name. This anime is the successor of the 1973 anime. It was produced by Shin-Ei Animation and premiered on April 2, 1979 on TV Asahi.

This Doraemon anime series is sometimes referred to in Asia as the Ōyama Edition (大山版), after Nobuyo Ōyama, the voice actress who voices Doraemon in this series.

Two official English dubs of this anime series have been released, the first of which was called The Adventures of Albert and Sidney and was made in Canada by CINAR and aired exclusively in Barbados on CBC TV 8 during the late 1988 and early 1996, it was planned to air in the US on Superstation WTBS (now known as TBS) but never premiered for unknown reasons, the second was made in Singapore and aired on Channel i & Kids Central from 2002 to 2003 in Singapore. Additionally, an unofficial bootleg English dub by Speedy Video was produced and released exclusively in Malaysia on various VCDs. 8 seasons containing 52 episodes each(each of the 416 episodes contains 2 short episodes or stories each, making 832 episodes in total) of Hindi Dub have been released on Amazon Prime India.

Cast

Music

Opening themes

Two songs were used for a separate weekday Doraemon series which is a part of Fujiko Fujio Theater (藤子不二雄劇場, Fujiko Fujio Gekijoo), the first song being the same as the first song of the weekly series.

Ending themes
The ending themes used for the weekly Doraemon series airing between 1979 and 2005 were:

Three songs were used for the separate weekday Doraemon series. The start and end dates are not listed here, nor are the episodes they ran for.

References

External links
Doraemon at TV Asahi 

 

Doraemon (anime)
1979 anime television series debuts
2005 Japanese television series endings
Japanese children's animated comedy television series
Japanese adult animated comedy television series
TV Asahi original programming